Pascopyrum is a monotypic genus of grass containing the sole species Pascopyrum smithii, which is known by the common names western wheatgrass and red-joint wheatgrass, after the red coloration of the nodes. It is native to North America.

Distribution
This is a sod-forming rhizomatous perennial grass which is native and common throughout most of North America. It grows in grassland and prairie in the Great Plains, where it is sometimes the dominant grass species. It is the state grass of North Dakota, South Dakota, and Wyoming.

Ecology
It is a valuable forage for animals such as bison and black-tailed prairie dogs, and it is good for grazing livestock. It is used for revegetation of disturbed and overgrazed habitat, and many cultivars have been developed to suit various conditions, including low-maintenance lawns. Wheatgrass generally tolerates mowing to four inches, but does not tolerate shade. Healthy stands may crowd out other species, making it more suitable for monoculture plantings.

References

External links
Jepson Manual Treatment
USDA Plants Profile
Photo gallery

Pooideae
Monotypic Poaceae genera
Grasses of the United States
Grasses of Canada
Flora of North America
Native grasses of California
Symbols of Wyoming
Symbols of North Dakota
Symbols of South Dakota